Warao (also known as Guarauno, Guarao, Warrau) is the native language of the Warao people. A language isolate, it is spoken by about 33,000 people primarily in northern Venezuela, Guyana and Suriname. It is notable for its unusual object–subject–verb word order. The 2015 Venezuelan  film Gone with the River was spoken in Warao.

Classification
Warao appears to be a language isolate, unrelated to any recorded language in the region or elsewhere. Terrence Kaufman (1994) included it in his hypothetical Macro-Paezan family, but the necessary supporting work was never done. Julian Granberry connected many of the grammatical forms, including nominal and verbal suffixes, of Warao to the Timucua language of North Florida, also a language isolate. However, he has also derived Timucua morphemes from Muskogean, Chibchan, Paezan, Arawakan, and other Amazonian languages, suggesting multi-language creolization as a possible explanation for these similarities.

Waroid hypothesis

Granberry also finds "Waroid" vocabulary items in Guajiro (from toponymic evidence it seems that the Warao or a related people once occupied Goajiro country) and in Taino (nuçay or nozay [nosái] "gold" in Ciboney — cf. Warao naséi símo "gold" (lit. "yellow pebble") — and duho "ceremonial stool" in Classic Taino — cf. Warao duhu "sit, stool"). Granberry & Vescelius (2004) note that toponymic evidence suggests that the pre-Taino Macorix language of Hispaniola and the Guanahatabey language of Cuba may have been Waroid languages as well.

Language contact
Jolkesky (2016) notes that there are lexical similarities with the Cariban, Arutani, Máku, and Sape language families due to contact within an earlier Guiana Highlands interaction sphere.

Demographics
The language had an estimated 28,100 speakers in Venezuela as of 2007. The Warao people live chiefly in the  Orinoco Delta region of northeastern Venezuela, with smaller communities in southwestern Trinidad (Trinidad and Tobago), western Guyana and Suriname. The language is considered endangered by UNESCO.

Varieties
Loukotka (1968) lists these varieties:

Guanoco - spoken on the Laguna de Asfalto, state of Monagas (unattested)
Chaguan - spoken in the Orinoco Delta on the Manamo branch (unattested)
Mariusa - spoken in the same region on the Cocuina and Macareo branches

Mason (1950) lists:

Waikeri (Guaiqueri)
Chaguan
Mariusa

Grammar
The language's basic word order has been analyzed as object–subject–verb, a very rare word order among nominative–accusative languages such as Warao.

Phonology 
The Warao consonant inventory is small, but not quite as small as many other South American inventories. It does not contain any notable exotica.

[b] and [d, ɺ] are allophones of // and /ɾ/. There are five oral vowels  and five nasal vowels . /u/ after /k/ within the beginning of words has a sound as [ɨ].

Vocabulary
Loukotka (1968) lists the following basic vocabulary items for Uarao (Warao) and Mariusa.

{| class="wikitable sortable"
! gloss !! Uarao !! Mariusa
|-
! one
| isaka || xisaka
|-
! two
| manámo || manamo
|-
! three
| dianamu || dixamo
|-
! head
| akua || naxoto
|-
! eye
| kamu || mu
|-
! tooth
| kai || i
|-
! man
| nibora || 
|-
! water
| ho || xo
|-
! fire
| hekono || xeunu
|-
! sun
| yá || xokoxi
|-
! manioc
| aru || aru
|-
! jaguar
| tobe || tobe
|-
! house
| xanóko || ubanoko
|}

References

Other sources
 
 Barral, Basilio de. 1979. Diccionario Warao-Castellano, Castellano-Warao. Caracas: UCAB
 Figeroa, Andrés Romero. 1997. A Reference Grammar of Warao. München, Newcastle: Lincom
 Ponce, Peter. 2004. Diccionario Español - Warao. Fundación Turismo de Pedernales.
 Vaquero, Antonio. 1965. Idioma Warao. Morfología, sintaxis, literatura. Estudios Venezolanos Indígenas. Caracas.
 Wilbert, Johannes. 1964. Warao Oral Litrerature. Instituto Caribe de Antropología y Sociología. Fundación La Salle de Ciencias Naturales. Monograph no 9 Caracas: Editorial Sucre.
 Wilbert, Johannes.  1969. Textos Folklóricos de los Indios Warao. Los Angeles: Latin American Center. University of California. Latin American Studies Vol. 12.

External links

 Warao-Spanish dictionary
 Warao Language by Stefanie Herrmann

Languages of Venezuela
Languages of Suriname
Languages of Guyana
Language isolates of South America
Macro-Paesan languages
Agglutinative languages
Object–subject–verb languages
Endangered language isolates
Endangered indigenous languages of the Americas